Sergio Torres may refer to:

People
Sergio Torres Félix (born 1966), Mexican politician
Sergio Torres (footballer, born 1981), Argentine footballer
Sergio Torres (footballer, born 1984), Spanish footballer
Sergio Torres Torres, Puerto Rican mayor

Other uses
Sergio Torres Stadium, football stadium in El Salvador for C.D. Luis Ángel Firpo

Torres, Sergio